The Immaculate Conception Cathedral  also called Puerto Baquerizo Moreno Cathedral is a religious building belonging to the Catholic Church and is located in the town of Puerto Baquerizo Moreno on San Cristóbal Island, one of which forms the Galápagos Islands, which administratively is included in the Province of Galápagos in the South American country of Ecuador.

The temple follows the Roman or Latin rite and serves as the seat of the Apostolic Vicariate of Galápagos (Apostolicus Vicariatus galapagensis) that was created by Pope Benedict XVI on 15 July 2008 based on the territory of the former prefecture of Galapagos had Pope Pius XII established in 1950. It is under the pastoral responsibility of the apostolic vicar Áureo Patricio Bonilla Bonilla.

See also
Roman Catholicism in Ecuador
Immaculate Conception Cathedral

References

Roman Catholic cathedrals in Ecuador
Puerto Baquerizo Moreno
Roman Catholic churches completed in 1962
20th-century Roman Catholic church buildings in Ecuador